The political district Bezirk Korneuburg is located in Lower Austria and borders Vienna to the north.

Communities 

Bisamberg
Bisamberg
Klein-Engersdorf
Enzersfeld
Enzersfeld, Königsbrunn
Ernstbrunn
Au, Dörfles, Ernstbrunn, Gebmanns, Klement, Lachsfeld, Maisbirbaum, Merkersdorf, Naglern, Simonsfeld, Steinbach, Thomasl
Gerasdorf bei Wien
Gerasdorf, Föhrenhain, Kapellerfeld, Oberlisse, Seyring
Großmugl
Füllersdorf, Geitzendorf, Glaswein, Großmugl, Herzogbirbaum, Nursch, Ottendorf, Ringendorf, Roseldorf, Steinabrunn
Großrußbach
Großrußbach, Hipples, Karnabrunn, Kleinebersdorf, Weinsteig, Wetzleinsdorf
Hagenbrunn
Flandorf, Hagenbrunn
Harmannsdorf
Harmannsdorf, Hetzmannsdorf, Kleinrötz, Lerchenau, Mollmannsdorf, Obergänserndorf, Rückersdorf, Seebarn, Würnitz
Hausleiten
Gaisruck, Goldgeben, Hausleiten, Perzendorf, Pettendorf, Schmida, Seitzersdorf-Wolfpassing, Zaina, Zissersdorf
Korneuburg
Langenzersdorf
Leitzersdorf
Hatzenbach, Kleinwilfersdorf, Leitzersdorf, Wiesen, Wollmannsberg
Leobendorf
Leobendorf, Oberrohrbach, Tresdorf, Unterrohrbach
Niederhollabrunn
Bruderndorf, Haselbach, Niederfellabrunn, Niederhollabrunn, Streitdorf
Rußbach
Niederrußbach, Oberrußbach, Stranzendorf
Sierndorf
Höbersdorf, Oberhautzental, Obermallebarn, Oberolberndorf, Senning, Sierndorf, Unterhautzental, Untermallebarn, Unterparschenbrunn
Spillern
Stetteldorf am Wagram
Eggendorf am Wagram, Inkersdorf, Starnwörth, Stetteldorf am Wagram
Stetten
Stockerau
Oberzögersdorf, Stockerau, Unterzögersdorf

Changes
Since 2017 Gerasdorf bei Wien is now part of the district on the dissolution of the Wien-Umgebung District.

References

External links 
 korneuburg.gv.at
 KO2100 Korneuburg Community
 Korneuburg.cc (unofficial homepage)

 
Districts of Lower Austria